Heliamphora huberi is a species of Marsh Pitcher Plant endemic to the Chimantá Massif in Venezuela, where it grows at elevations of 1850–2200 m in a variety of habitats. It has thus far been recorded from Angasima-tepui, Apacará-tepui, Amurí-tepui, Acopán-tepui, and the border of Torono- and Chimantá-tepui. Due to its intermediate appearance between species related to H. minor and H. heterodoxa, it is suspected to be of hybridogenic origin.

References

Further reading

  Fleischmann, A. & J.R. Grande Allende 2012 ['2011']. Taxonomía de Heliamphora minor Gleason (Sarraceniaceae) del Auyán-tepui, incluyendo una nueva variedad. [Taxonomy of Heliamphora minor Gleason (Sarraceniaceae) from Auyán-tepui, including a new variety.] Acta Botánica Venezuelica 34(1): 1–11.

External links
 Habitat photographs of Heliamphora huberi

huberi
Flora of Venezuela
Plants described in 2009
Flora of the Tepuis